Arista may refer to:

Organizations 
Arista Networks, a software defined networking company
Arista Records, an American record label, division of Sony Music
Arista Nashville, a record label specializing in country music
Arista (honor society), the name of New York public school chapters of the National Honor Society

People 
Íñigo Arista of Pamplona (ca 790–851), first King of Pamplona
Mariano Arista (1802–1855), President of Mexico
Noelani Arista, Hawaiian and American historian

Other 
Arista (1956 automobile), a French automobile produced from 1952 to 1967
Arista (1912 automobile), a French automobile produced from 1912 to 1915
Arista, one of Ariel's elder sisters from The Little Mermaid series
Arista (insect anatomy), a bristle or bristle-like appendage
Villa de Arista, a town and municipality in central Mexico
Arista, West Virginia, an unincorporated community